West Riverfront is a neighborhood within the city limits of Tampa, Florida. As of the 2000 census the neighborhood had a population of 1,345. The ZIP Codes serving the neighborhood are 33606 and 33607.

Geography
West Riverfront boundaries are Cass Street to the south, North Boulevard to the east, Rome Avenue to the west, and Interstate 275 to the north.

Demographics
Source: Hillsborough County Atlas

As of the census of 2000, there were 1,345 people and 542 households residing in the neighborhood. The population density was 6,375/mi2. The racial makeup of the neighborhood was 2% White, 96% African American, 1% Native American, 0% Asian, 0% from other races, and 2% from two or more races. Hispanic or Latino of any race were 2% of the population.

There were 542 households, out of which 32% had children under the age of 18 living with them, 16% were married couples living together, 28% had a female householder with no husband present, and 7% were non-families. 42% of all households were made up of individuals.

In the neighborhood the population was spread out, with 35% under the age of 18, 17% from 18 to 34, 25% from 35 to 49, 7% from 50 to 64, and 17% who were 65 years of age or older. For every 100 females, there were 85.8 males.

The per capita income for the neighborhood was $11,624. About 29% of the population were below the poverty line, 36% of those are under the age of 18.

See also
Neighborhoods in Tampa, Florida

References

External links
West Riverfront Neighborhood Association

Neighborhoods in Tampa, Florida